Havens is an unincorporated community in Jackson Township, Sandusky County, Ohio, United States.

History
A post office called Havens was established in 1898, and remained in operation until 1905. Frank Havens, the first postmaster, gave the community his name.

References

Populated places in Sandusky County, Ohio